Korsnäs is a municipality of Finland. It is located in the Ostrobothnia region.

Geography

Korsnäs is the most western mainland municipality in Finland.

It has a long, rocky coastline along the Gulf of Bothnia. The three largest islands are Halsön, Bredskäret and Södra Björkön, all used as important recreation areas for urban dwellers.

History
Due to the post-glacial rebound, most of the area that today forms the municipality of Korsnäs stood under water until around 1000 A.D. The first settlement in Korsnäs is assumed to stem from the 13th century. Some place names of Finnish origin (such as Molpe (Moikipää) and Taklax (Takalaksi)) indicate a Finnish-speaking presence in the 13th century, although it is disputed if these people (probably from Häme) only used the area for fishing on a seasonly basis or if they established a proper, but sparse, settlement. Swedish-speaking settlers came to the area in the 13th or 14th century.

Population

The municipality is bilingual with Swedish as the majority language and Finnish as the minority language. Until 2014 Swedish was the sole official language.  of the population speaks Swedish,  Finnish and  other languages as their first language.

Politics
In the 2017 Municipal elections Swedish People's Party got 95 percent of the vote, which obtained it each of the 21 seats of the municipality council.

Name
Korsnäs is the municipality's official name in both Swedish and Finnish. The Finnish names Korsnääsi or Ristitaipale are known to have been used historically in some contexts.

Korsnäs was first mentioned in historical documents is 1442, and some individual villages, like Molpe (then called Moikipä) was first mentioned in 1490, and Harrström (then called Harffuaström) in 1494. Korsnäs became an independent municipality in 1887. Prior to that, the area belonged to Närpes.

References

External links

Municipality of Korsnäs – Official website
Finnish encyclopedia from 1925–1928 with "Korsnääsi" as entry

Municipalities of Ostrobothnia (region)
Populated coastal places in Finland
Populated places established in 1887